Producing Adults (Children and Adults – How To Make Them?) is a 2004 Finnish comedy drama written by Pekko Pesonen and directed by Aleksi Salmenperä. It was Finland's official Academy Award submission for Best Foreign Language Film of 2004.

Plot
The film deals with the myriad complications arising from Venla's (Minna Haapkylä) desire to have a child.  Her longtime boyfriend Antero (Kari-Pekka Toivonen) is reluctant, fearing that fatherhood will imperil his last chance to succeed in his speed skating career and by seeing his friend go through fatherhood.  Antero does some extreme things to avoid getting Venla pregnant and she begins to be equally devious in her attempts to conceive.  Venla seeks help from her bisexual co-worker at a fertility clinic and the relationship between the two begins to blossom amongst many setbacks.

Cast
Minna Haapkylä as Venla
Kari-Pekka Toivonen as Antero
Minttu Mustakallio as Satu
Tommi Eronen as Rönkkö	
Pekka Strang as Miro
Dick Idman as Claes

Production
Producing Adults was shot on one camera in 40 days, on a budget of $1,200,000 euros.

Release
The film was released in Sweden as Hela vägen (All the Way) on 26 November 2004.

Home media
Producing Adults was released on DVD in North America by Wolfe Video on 19 July 2005. In Region 2, the DVD was released by Peccadillo Pictures on 12 April 2010.

Reception

Critical response
Variety described Producing Adults as "small but charming" and with a lesbian theme that "comes gradually and naturally into the story which never succumbs to the men-are-bad, women-are-fine cliche." AfterEllen said that "While we all adore a good coming out story ... sometimes it's nice to see a more realistic look at romance in all of its heartbreaking complexity." The Hollywood Reporter praised it as "an insightful, well-acted film."

Accolades
Minttu Mustakallio won "Best Supporting Actress" at the 2005 Jussi Awards (Finland's main film industry awards). Aleksi Salmenperä won the FIPRESCI Prize at the Stockholm Film Awards.

References

Further reading
  (Wolfe Video DVD review)

External links
  (Archive)
  Lapsia ja aikuisia – Producing Adults at BBFC
  Lapsia ja aikuisia – kuinka niitä tehdään? at BFI
  Producing Adults (Lapsia ja aikuisia – kuinka niitä tehdään?) at Finnish Film Foundation (Archive)
  Lapsia ja aikuisia – Kuinka niitä tehdään? at Lumiere
  Lapsia ja aikuisia at Swedish Film Institute
 
 

2004 films
2004 comedy-drama films
Bisexuality-related films
LGBT-related comedy-drama films
Finnish comedy-drama films
2000s Finnish-language films
Finnish LGBT-related films
Lesbian-related films
2004 LGBT-related films